Poortjieskloof Dam is a double curvature arch type dam located in the Groot River in Western Cape, South Africa. It was created in 1955 has been renovated in 1968. The dam mainly serves for irrigation purposes and its hazard potential has been ranked high (3).

There is a lovely gravel road pass that was built by the Department of Water Affairs as part of the access road and construction for the Poortjieskloof Dam. Access is available within certain hours, by permit only. This is a popular fresh water fishing venue. The road is an out and back route and terminates at a view-site adjacent to the dam wall. The road is 5.5 km long and you have to return the way you entered, making the total drive 11 km.

The road has some very sharp turns and one or two places where the gradient is 1:4 (steep!).

See also
List of reservoirs and dams in South Africa

References 

 List of South African Dams from the Department of Water Affairs and Forestry (South Africa)

Dams in South Africa